Kyle Smith may refer to:

 Kyle Smith (critic) (born 1966),  American critic, novelist, essayist
 Kyle Smith (American football) (born 1984), American football player and executive
 Kyle Smith (basketball) (born 1969), American basketball coach
 Kyle Smith (curler) (born 1992), Scottish curler
 Kyle Smith (motorcyclist) (born 1991), British motorcycle racer
 Kyle Smith (soccer, born 1973), retired American soccer midfielder/defender
 Kyle Smith (soccer, born 1992), American soccer defender